Dinicu is a Romanian surname. It may refer to:

 Angheluş Dinicu (?–?, ca. 19th century), Romanian composer, naist (panpiper) and violinist – grandfather of Grigoraș Dinicu
 Grigoraș Dinicu (complete: Grigoraș Ionică Dinicu; 1889–1949), Romanian composer, arranger and violinist – grandson of Angheluș Dinicu
 Ionică Dinicu (born as: Ionică Dinu; ?–?), Romanian musician singer and lutanist
 Dimitrie A. Dinicu (1868–1936), Romanian musician
 Dimitrie D. Dinicu (?–?), Romanian violinist/violoncellist and music teacher/professor
 Dimitrie G. Dinicu (1898–1964), Romanian musician
 Gheorghe A. Dinicu (1863–1930), Romanian musician
 Nicolae A. Dinicu (1879–1954), Romanian musician
 Sile Dinicu (native: Vasile Dinicu; 1919–1993), Romanian composer, conductor, arranger and pianist
 Carolina Varga Dinicu (stage name: Morocco; b. 1940), Romanian Romance US American dancer and dancing master
 Florica Dinicu (b. 1957), Romanian actor
 Viorica Dinicu (b. ?[/?–?]), Romanian actor (in the film: Anotimpul iubirii, 1986)

Dinicu is the Romanian forename of:

 Dinicu Golescu (Constantin Radovici Golescu; 1777–1830), a member of the Golescu family of boyars, was a Wallachian Romanian man of letters, mostly noted for his travel writings and journalism

Romanian-language surnames